Plectrocnemia remota is a species of tube maker caddisfly in the family Polycentropodidae. It is found in North America.

References

Trichoptera
Articles created by Qbugbot
Insects described in 1911